The Colt Woodsman is a semi-automatic sporting pistol manufactured by the U.S.Colt's Manufacturing Company from 1915 to 1977. It was designed by John Moses Browning. The frame design changed over time, in three distinct series: series one being 1915–1941, series two 1947–1955, and series three being 1955–1977.

Design
The Colt Woodsman sprang from a design by John Moses Browning and was refined by gunsmiths and designers at Colt's before its introduction in 1915.

Browning developed the Woodsman with a short slide, no grip safety and no hammer. These features were in place on his Model 1903 and 1911 designs, but a handgun intended for target use did not require them.

Variants and versions
There are three series of the Colt Woodsman and each series had three models: Target, Sport and Match Target.

First Series 1915–1941
The Target Model was the base model and featured a 6" barrel with adjustable front and rear sights. It was not until 1927 that the name "Woodsman" was used.

The Sport Model was designed as a field sidearm for hiking and camping in 1933 and had a 4.5" barrel. Original versions were made with a fixed front sight in the first series, but by the latter half of production, an adjustable sight was available.

The Match Target Model debuted in 1938 and featured a heavier barrel with a one piece wrap-around grip known as the "elephant ear." A "Bullseye" Icon was rollmarked into the slide lending the nickname "Bullseye Match Target".

In 1941 as the US entered World War II, Colt ceased civilian production of the Woodsman but delivered 4000 Match Target models to the US Government as late as 1945. These pistols had oversized plastic two-piece grips and were marked "Property US Government", but appeared on the surplus market after the war.

Second Series 1948–1955
Colt resumed production of the Woodsman in 1948. The three Models remained the same, but were built on a longer heavier frame and had a magazine safety, automatic slide stop and magazine release located at the rear of the trigger guard. Colt also introduced the less expensive Challenger model, which came equipped with fixed sights and featured a magazine release near bottom aft side of the grip.

Special versions were made for the United States Marine Corps (100 Match Target Models and 2500 Sport Models); United States Air Force (925 Target Models) and 75 Match Target Models for the United States Coast Guard. The Air Force models had no special markings and most were sold as surplus through the Director of Civilian Marksmanship Program. The bulk of the Marine and Coast Guard versions were destroyed and sold as scrap metal.

Third Series 1955–1977
Colt changed the design of the Woodsman in 1955. The three Models remained the same, but the markings, grips and sights underwent slight changes. The most significant was relocating the magazine release from the rear of the trigger guard to the heel of the grip as on the first series. Colt also introduced new models, such as the less expensive Huntsman Model equipped with fixed sights. From 1960 walnut stocks with a thumbrest were optional, in place of the standard black plastic stocks.

See also 
 List of firearms
 Ruger MkII

References

Cited in footnotes

Chandler, Raymond T. 2002.  ‘Trouble is My Business’ originally published in Dime Detective Magazine, August, 1939. Republished in Raymond Chandler: Collected Stories. 2002. Everyman's Library, Alfred A. Knopf, New York. P. 1009.
Hemingway, Ernest. 1938. 'My Pal the Gorilla Gargantua' in Hemingway on Hunting ed. Sean Hemingway. The Lyons Press, Connecticut. p. 189 Originally published in Ken Magazine, July 28, 1938

External links 
 Collector's Guide to the Colt Woodsman
 Background information
 Colt Woodsman FAQ

Firearms by John Browning
Woodsman
.22 LR pistols